HRMavenir Systems, Inc. dba Mavenir is an American telecommunications software company, created in 2017 as a result of a three-way merger of existing companies and technologies, that develops and supplies cloud-native software to the communications service provider (CSP) market.

The company is headquartered in Richardson, Texas. Mavenir’s 2019 turnover was US$427.4 million. The company had 4,100 employees and more than 250 telecoms service provider customers at the end of 2020.

History

Predecessor companies 
Mavenir has a complex corporate history as a result of successive acquisitions and spin-offs. The main historical predecessors are:

 Xura, which was composed of pieces of Comverse, Inc., Acision, and a number of other acquired companies. Comverse, Inc derived from Comverse Technology, was active in traditional value-added services (VAS), digital cloud services, Unified Communications (VoIP & UC), and a suite of evolved communication services. Acision was a privately held secure mobile messaging and engagement services firm. These entities were combined in 2015 to form Xura, which focused on two core product areas: digital communications services and converged communications (traditional and IP). 

 An older entity with a similar name, Mavenir Systems, initially a company focused on transition from 3G to 4G with IMS products and solutions, founded in 2006. It acquired Airwide Solutions, Stoke and Ulticom and In 2013, the company went public on NYSE with MVNR ticker symbol. The company was acquired by Mitel Networks Corporation in 2015 to create Mitel Mobility.

 Ranzure Networks, a startup focused on developing 5G cloud-based radio access network technology.

How it came together: 

In mid-2016, Xura was acquired by affiliates of Siris Capital Group in a deal that valued the company at approximately $643 million. On 19 December 2016, affiliates of Xura agreed to acquire Mitel Mobility, for $385 million, and Ranzure Networks Inc., for an undisclosed sum.

The New Mavenir
When the transactions completed on February 8, 2017, the newly merged company was renamed Mavenir Systems Inc., trading under the Mavenir brand.

Mavenir has continued to acquire technology - including its acquisitions of Aquto, a cloud-based sponsored data platform (2018); Argyle Data (2018), a machine learning security platform; Brocade’s vEPC and ip.access (2020), a specialist small cell vendor.

On 6 October 2020, Mavenir announced that it had filed a registration statement for an initial public offering (IPO) of ordinary shares on Nasdaq. Due to market volatility in the run-up to the 2020 US elections the company postponed the IPO on 28 October but stated that it would keep market conditions under review in the following months.

Company timeline
 2005: Mavenir Systems founded
 2008: Mavenir Systems completes round of funding for $17.5 million 
 2010: Mavenir Systems completes a round of funding round for $13.5 million backed by Alloy Ventures, Austin Ventures and North Bridge Venture Partners
 2011: Mavenir Systems completes round of funding for $40 million backed by August Capital and including existing investors Alloy Ventures, Austin Ventures, North Bridge Venture Partners and Greenspring Associates
 2011: Mavenir Systems acquired Airwide Solutions, a messaging specialist, for $40 million
 2013: Mavenir Systems IPO (NYSE) under ticker MVNR, raising $44.5 million 
 2014: acquired security gateway vendor Stoke for $2.9 million plus $1.9 million of debt
 2015: acquired signalling vendor Ulticom for $20 million 
 2015: acquired by Mitel Networks Corporation for $560 million   
 2016: rebranded by Mitel to Mitel Mobile, then sold to Xura (for $350 million) 
 2016: Pardeep Kohli and Ashok Khuntia founded Ranzure to disrupt the Radio Access Network market through cloud-based virtualisation. Ranzure raises $13 million in Series A funding.
 2016: Xura acquired Ranzure 
 2017: Siris merges Xura, Ranzure and Mitel Mobile and rebrands as Mavenir
 2017: Brocade vEPCc acquisition
 2018: acquired Aquto 
 2018: acquired Argyle Data
 2020: acquired ip.access
2020: IPO postponed due to market volatility

CEO
Mavenir’s President and Chief Executive Officer is Pardeep Kohli who has been associated with several of the ventures that make up the company today. He has been in his current post since December 2016 and was previously CEO of Xura, which he joined after it acquired Ranzure, a company that Kohli had founded earlier that year. Before Ranzure, Kohli had been President and CEO of Mavenir Systems, Inc, guiding it through its IPO in November 2013, and subsequent acquisition by Mitel Networks Corporation in 2015. 

Prior to Mavenir Systems, Pardeep was Co-Founder, President and CEO of Spatial Wireless, which was acquired by Alcatel in 2004

Deployments

Customers
The company says it has 250+ operator customers in 120 countries, including 17 of the top 20 largest operators. Known examples include:

 2012 – MetroPCS - VoLTE solution to support what was claimed to be a world's first
 2014 – T-Hrvatski Telekom - IMS HSS-FE
 2015 – T-Mobile USA - RCS
 2017 – Sprint – NFV Cloud Deployment
 2018 – Telefonica Germany – Virtualised IMS for VoLTE and VoWiFi
 2019 – Verizon – cloud core
 2019 – Partner – virtualized mobile core
 2019 - Cellcom – virtualised IMS mobile core and VoWiFi
 2019 – Telefónica Argentina - Signalling Firewall
 2019 – Vodafone - Open RAN
 2019 – Vodafone Idea – “Network as a Platform”
 2020 – T-Mobile Czech Republic and Slovak Telekom – NFV Harmonised IMS
 2020 – Telefonica “O2” UK - virtualised IMS
 2020 – Hudson Valley Wireless – Cloud-native LTE packet core
 2020 – Rakuten Mobile RCS
 2020 – Turkcell – Cloud-native IMS
 2020 – Dish - Open RAN
 2020 – Vodafone Idea – Open RAN
 2020 – Deutsche Telekom, Telefonica, Vodafone – RCS interconnection in Germany

Trials

Mavenir has been involved in OpenRAN and other virtualisation trials with several operators. Partnerships in the public domain include:

 2018 – Baicells – XRAN (Open RAN) interface testing
 2020 – Telefonica “O2” UK - OpenRAN
 2020 – Deutsche Telekom – web-scale validation of 5G SA core
 2020 – Airtel – Open RAN RAN Intelligent Controller (RIC)

Technology partnerships
 2019 – OEM agreement with Big Switch
 2019 – OpenRAN integration with Sunwave
 2020 – 5G private networks in Germany with Mugler
 2020 – Open RAN solutions in Japan with NEC
 2020 – Open RAN solutions in the USA with Goodman Networks
 2020 – Open RAN solutions in the USA with GDT
 2020 – Open RAN collaboration with Altiostar
 2020 – Open RAN collaboration with Comba Telecom in Turkey
 2020 – 5G campus networks systems integration in Germany with NTT Data
 2020 – 5G core UPF with NVIDIA
 2020 – RCS Business Messaging with Microsoft Azure
 2020 – Open RAN Remote Radio Head development with MTI

References

External links
 Official website

Software companies established in 2017
Software companies based in Texas
Companies based in Richardson, Texas
Telecommunications companies of Israel
Telecommunications companies of the United States
Software companies of the United States